The 2015–16 Northern Arizona Lumberjacks women's basketball team represented Northern Arizona University during the 2015–16 NCAA Division I women's basketball season. The Lumberjacks, led by fourth year head coach Sue Darling and played their home games at the Walkup Skydome and the Rolle Activity Center. They were members of the Big Sky Conference. They finished the season 6–24, 2–16 in Big Sky to finish in a 3 way tie for tenth place. They lost in the first round of the Big Sky women's tournament to Montana.

Roster

Schedule

|-
!colspan=9 style="background:#003466; color:#FFCC00;"| Non-conference regular season

|-
!colspan=9 style="background:#003466; color:#FFCC00;"| Big Sky regular season

|-
!colspan=9 style="background:#003466; color:#FFCC00;"| Big Sky Women's Tournament

See also
 2015–16 Northern Arizona Lumberjacks men's basketball team

References

Northern Arizona
Northern Arizona Lumberjacks women's basketball seasons